Amphibolips confluenta, known generally as the spongy oak apple gall wasp, is a species of gall wasp in the family Cynipidae. Its range includes Ontario, Quebec, and much of the eastern United States. Hosts include Quercus buckleyi, Quercus coccinea, Quercus falcata, Quercus ilicifolia, Quercus marilandica, Quercus rubra, Quercus shumardii, and Quercus velutina.

References

Cynipidae
Fauna of the Eastern United States
Insects of Canada
Gall-inducing insects
Oak galls